The 2003 Western Kentucky Hilltoppers football team represented Western Kentucky University in the 2003 NCAA Division I-AA football season and were led by first-year head coach David Elson. Coming off winning the NCAA Division I-AA Championship the previous year, this team contended for Gateway Football Conference championship but ended up finishing tied for 3rd.  They made the school's fourth straight appearance in the NCAA Division I-AA playoffs, beating Jacksonville State in the first round before losing to Wofford in the quarterfinals.  The Hilltoppers finished the season ranked number 7 in final 1AA postseason national poll.

This team included future NFL players Anthony Oakley and Brian Claybourn.  Matt Lange and Buster Ashley were named to the AP All American team and Justin Haddix was Gateway Conference Freshman of The Year.  The All-Conference team included Ashley, Jeremy Chandler, Claybourn, Erik Dandy, Lange, Karl Maslowski, Casey Rooney, Antonio Veals, Daniel Withrow, Chad Kincaid, Oakley, and Charles Thompson.

Schedule

References

Western Kentucky
Western Kentucky Hilltoppers football seasons
Western Kentucky Hilltoppers football